Igor "Idže" Stefanovski (born 27 December 1982) is a Macedonian professional rally driver. He is currently competing in the European Touring Car Cup (ETCC). Stefanovski is a former European Hill Climb Championship participant, where he has won the championship twice, in 2014 and 2015. In his debut season in ETCC he will be a part of slovenian LEMA Racing team, driving a SEAT León Cup Racer.

Stefanovski is the most popular and most successful Macedonian racing driver. "Idže" was voted Best athlete of Macedonia in 2014.

Racing record

Complete TCR Europe Series results
(key) (Races in bold indicate pole position) (Races in italics indicate fastest lap)

References

External links

1982 births
Living people
Sportspeople from Skopje
European Touring Car Cup drivers
Macedonian racing drivers
TCR Europe Touring Car Series drivers